Alberto Fernández Blanco (15 January 1955 – 14 December 1984)  was a Spanish road racing cyclist. His son Alberto Fernández Sainz is also a road racing cyclist.

Fernández was born in Cuena, Cantabria. As an amateur, he won the Spanish mountain bike championships, and turned professional in 1978. During his career, he was nicknamed el Galleta ("the Biscuit"), because the town where he lived, Aguilar de Campoo, had several biscuit factories.

Fernández tested positive for the stimulant Methylphenidate (Ritalin) on stage 17 of the 1982 Vuelta a España.

His best results came during the last two years of his career. He finished 10th overall in the 1982 Tour de France, and 3rd in his first appearance in the 1983 Giro d'Italia. He also finished 3rd in the 1983 Vuelta a España, improving to 2nd in 1984, only 6 seconds behind winner Éric Caritoux (the smallest winning margin in any of the Grand Tours).

He and his wife died in a car accident in December 1984, just short of his 30th birthday.

Major results

1975
 1st Subida a Gorla
1976
 7th Overall Tour de l'Avenir
1978
 2nd Overall Vuelta a los Valles Mineros
 4th Overall Vuelta a Cantabria
 5th Subida a Arrate
 7th Overall Vuelta a Asturias
 8th Overall Setmana Catalana de Ciclisme
 10th Overall Tour of the Basque Country
1979
 1st  Overall Vuelta a Asturias
 3rd Clásica de Sabiñánigo
 5th Overall Vuelta a la Comunidad Valenciana
 9th Overall Tour of the Basque Country
1980
 1st  Overall Tour of the Basque Country
1st Stage 5b (ITT)
 1st  Overall Vuelta a los Valles Mineros
1st Stage 3a
 1st Stage 3 Vuelta a Cantabria
 1st Stage 4 Costa del Azahar
 6th Overall Deutschland Tour
 8th Overall Volta a Catalunya
1981
 1st  Overall Vuelta a los Valles Mineros
1st Stage 3a
 1st  Overall Vuelta a la Comunidad Valenciana
1st Stage 4b (ITT)
 2nd Overall Vuelta a La Rioja
 3rd Overall Setmana Catalana de Ciclisme
1st Stage 2b (ITT)
 3rd Overall Escalada a Montjuïc
 6th Overall Volta a Catalunya
 6th Clásica de San Sebastián
 6th Subida al Naranco
 10th Overall Vuelta a Andalucía
1982
 1st  Overall Volta a Catalunya
1st Stage 7a
 1st Stages 3 & 4b Vuelta a Burgos
 1st Stage 1 Tour of the Basque Country
 1st Stage 3 (ITT) Tour Méditerranéen
 3rd Overall Vuelta a Andalucía
 8th Overall Paris–Nice
 10th Overall Tour de France
1983
 1st  Overall Setmana Catalana de Ciclisme
1st Stage 2
 1st Memorial Gastone Nencini
 1st Subida a Arrate
 3rd Overall Giro d'Italia
1st Stages 6 & 17
 3rd Overall Vuelta a España
1st Stage 5
 5th Overall Tirreno–Adriatico
 5th Subida al Naranco
 8th Overall Tour of the Basque Country
1984
 1st Trofeo Masferrer
 2nd Overall Vuelta a España
 2nd Overall Vuelta Asturias
1st Stages 3 & 4
 5th Overall Tour of the Basque Country
 5th Overall Setmana Catalana de Ciclisme

Grand Tour general classification results timeline

References

External links

1955 births
1984 deaths
People from Campoo
Cyclists from Cantabria
Spanish male cyclists
Spanish Giro d'Italia stage winners
Spanish Vuelta a España stage winners
Spanish sportspeople in doping cases
Road incident deaths in Spain
Doping cases in cycling